Alia Volz is an American author. Her book Home Baked: Marijuana, My Mother and the Stoning of San Francisco was a National Book Critics Circle Award Autobiography finalist in 2020.

References

21st-century American women writers
American women non-fiction writers
Living people
Year of birth missing (living people)
Place of birth missing (living people)